Conistra takasago is a moth of the family Noctuidae. The species was first described by Yasunori Kishida and Hiroshi Yoshimoto in 1979. It is found in Taiwan.

References

Moths described in 1979
Cuculliinae